Davide Bottone (born 11 April 1986) is an Italian footballer who plays as a midfielder for Serie B team Varese.

Bottone was loaned to Biellese in summer 2006 but returned to Turin on 31 January 2007.

He  made his U21 debut in a friendly game against Germany in November 2008.

Honours

Player
 CFR Cluj
 Liga I - winner (2010)
 Romanian Cup - Winner (2010)

References

External links 
 
 
 Davide Bottone's profile on figc.it 
 
 

1986 births
Living people
Italian footballers
Italian expatriate footballers
S.S.D. Varese Calcio players
Torino F.C. players
L.R. Vicenza players
Serie A players
Serie B players
Liga I players
CFR Cluj players
Expatriate footballers in Romania
People from Biella
Association football midfielders
S.E.F. Torres 1903 players
Italian expatriate sportspeople in Romania
A.S.D. La Biellese players
Footballers from Piedmont
Sportspeople from the Province of Biella